The Toplica District is an administrative district in southern Serbia, named after the river Toplica. As of 2022 census, the district has a population of 77,900 inhabitants, making it the smallest district by population in Serbia. Its administrative center is the city of Prokuplje.

Municipalities
It encompasses the city of Prokuplje and three municipalities:
 Blace
 Kuršumlija
 Žitorađa

Demographics

As of 2022 census, the district has a population of 77,900 inhabitants.

Ethnic groups
Ethnic composition of the municipality:

See also
 Administrative divisions of Serbia
 Districts of Serbia

References 

Note: All official material made by Government of Serbia is public by law. Information was taken from official website.

External links

 

 
Districts of Southern and Eastern Serbia